Money transfer generally refers to one of the following cashless modes of payment or payment systems:

Electronic funds transfer, an umbrella term mostly used for bank card-based payments
Wire transfer, an international expedited bank-to-bank funds transfer
Giro (banking), also known as direct deposit
Money order, transfer by postal cheque, money gram or others
Postal order, purchased at a post office and is payable at another post office to the named recipient

Cash-based wire transfer systems
al-Barakat, an informal money transfer system originating in the Arab world
Hawala (also known as hundi), an informal system primarily used to send money
Remittance, a transfer of money by a foreign worker to his or her home country
Currency exchange, transfer for of one currency to another

See also 
 Transfer payment
 Cash carrier
 Foreign exchange company
 Money transmitter